Rene Gonzalez is an American attorney, entrepreneur, and Democratic politician. He challenged Portland City Commissioner Jo Ann Hardesty for her seat during the 2022 Portland, Oregon City Commission election, running on a platform that emphasized law-and-order and livability. He won the race with 52.6% of the vote, and took office in January 2023.

Early life and career 
Gonzalez was raised in Anchorage, Alaska, where his father worked as a trial judge and federal prosecutor. In 1993, he moved to Salem, Oregon to attend Willamette University for undergrad. While at Willamette, he was president of the Beta Theta Pi fraternity and played varsity soccer. After his undergrad, he continued at Willamette for his Juris Doctor degree.

After graduating, Gonzalez started his law career at Stoel Rives law firm based in Portland. After Stoel Rives, he moved to KinderCare Learning Centers, where he served as in legal advising and corporate strategy roles. Following KinderCare, Gonzlaez founded a technology consulting company called Eastbank Artifex that primarily sells Microsoft software services.

Prior to running for office, Gonzalez was known locally for founding United PDX, the largest youth soccer club in the city of Portland, and for organizing ED300, a political action committee focused on reopening public schools in the wake of the pandemic.

Portland City Council

Council race
Gonzalez ran for the Portland City Commissioner seat in 2022 against incumbent Hardesty. As of November 9, he garnered 54.3% of the vote versus 45.4% for Hardesty, leading to The Oregonian to declare him the winner and Hardesty to concede.

Gonzalez ran a campaign largely focused on combating homelessness, crime, and investing in revitalization of downtown. In particular, he and Hardesty have starkly different approaches to policing and how to address homelessness. Gonzalez was endorsed by the editorial boards of The Oregonian, Willamette Week, and the Portland Tribune, as well as the Portland Police Association, Portland Firefighters Union, and the Portland Chamber of Commerce. During the race, his campaign attracted some controversy for incurring a fine from the city's elections program for accepting discounted office space, but the fine was later overturned in court for failing to prove that the rent was in fact below market rate.

Though both candidates were registered Democrats, during the campaign Hardesty attempted to paint Gonzalez as right wing, with ties to Republican political consultants and conservative school board candidates supported by the political action committee he organized. The Portland Mercury criticized Gonzalez for posting an election thank you to supporters on his Twitter and tagging Quincy Franklin, a member of the far-right-wing group Patriot Prayer.

Council term
Gonzalez's term began on January 1, 2023. The transition team is being headed by Tom Miller, a former chief of staff for former city commissioner Sam Adams. Gonzalez will serve a two-year term before needing to run again. Gonzalez was assigned management of Portland Fire & Rescue and other emergency services, excluding the police department.

Personal life
Gonzalez is married to Angie, whom he met in college and who currently works as an office manager. Together they have three children. He identifies as half-Latino, as his father is Mexican-American and his mother is white.

References

Living people
American politicians of Mexican descent
Politicians from Portland, Oregon
Year of birth missing (living people)